David Barnes (1894–9 June 1970) was a New Zealand politician of the Labour Party.

Biography

Early life and career
Barnes was born and educated in England before migrating to New Zealand in 1908 with his parents. After arriving her became a farmer in the North Canterbury area until 1914 when he signed up for the Canterbury Mounted Rifles Regiment in World War I. After being wounded at Gallipoli he returned to New Zealand where he became the first returned serviceman to join the pilot school at Sockburn by the Canterbury Aviation Company before returning to England to completed his pilot training. Subsequently he served with English coastal defence forces until the end of the war. He returned to New Zealand to resume farming in North Canterbury, and later at Fairlie.

Member of Parliament

In Fairlie he started a branch of the Labour Party. He was also a founding member and president of the Fairlie Crown Tenant's Association branch. While in parliament he was a member of a parliamentary committee tasked with drafting the government's social security policies which later became the Social Security Act 1938.

In  Barnes contested the  seat unsuccessfully.

Later life and death
After exiting parliament he was a member of the Rehabilitation Board and was then a Director of the State Advances Corporation from 1939 to 1954.

He later commanded the Home Guard in the Timaru district. In 1940 he joined the Royal New Zealand Air Force (RNZAF) in 1940, Mr Barnes was made Adjutant of the Rongatai Training School. He later toured the country as a member of the RNZAF recruiting committee. Mr Barnes retired to Christchurch after World War II. He was the Labour Party's candidate for the Christchurch Mayoralty in 1947. He finished second in a three-way contest to the sitting mayor Ernest Andrews.

Barnes died on	9 June 1970, aged 76. He was survived by his wife and daughter.

Notes

References

1894 births
1970 deaths
New Zealand Labour Party MPs
Unsuccessful candidates in the 1938 New Zealand general election
Unsuccessful candidates in the 1943 New Zealand general election
New Zealand MPs for South Island electorates
Members of the New Zealand House of Representatives